Roger Gaston Louis Marche (5 March 1924 – 1 November 1997) was a French footballer who played as a defender. He was part of the France national team during the 1954 and 1958 World Cup tournaments. He was nicknamed Le Sanglier des Ardennes ("the Boar of the Ardenne") for the region from which he came.

Career
Marche, born in Villers-Semeuse, Ardennes, is one of the players with the most appearances in the French top division, having played 542 matches for the clubs Stade Reims and RC Paris.

He was a member of the France national team from 1947 to 1959, and became the most-capped player ever for France with 63 international matches played, surpassing Étienne Mattler's previous record of 46 caps set in 1940. Marche held the record until 1983, when the also defender Marius Trésor established a new mark with his 64th cap. Several players since have surpassed that cap total. He was also the nation's oldest goalscorer at 35 years and 287 days, until Olivier Giroud surpassed his record on 22 September 2022.

Marche died in 1997 in Charleville-Mézières.

Honours
Reims
Division 1: 1948–49, 1952–53; runner-up: 1946–47, 1953–54
Coupe de France: 1949–50
Trophée des Champions: 1949
Latin Cup: 1953

France
FIFA World Cup third place: 1958

References

External links

 
 

List of international appearances

1924 births
1997 deaths
French footballers
France international footballers
Association football defenders
1954 FIFA World Cup players
1958 FIFA World Cup players
Ligue 1 players
Stade de Reims players
Racing Club de France Football players
OFC Charleville players
Sportspeople from Ardennes (department)
Footballers from Grand Est